Tongogara Rural District Council is a local government organ administering Shurugwi District Rural District. There are two local government arms, Shurugwi Town Council created under the Zimbabwe Urban Councils Act, Chapter 29.15 administering Shurugwi, and Tongogara RDC created in terms of the Zimbabwe Rural District Councils Act, Chapter 29.13 overseeing the rural Shurugwi South District

Background

Tongogara Rural District Council is the official name of Shurugwi Rural District Council. It is one of the eight rural district councils in the Midlands Province. The other seven are; 
 Mberengwa RDC in Mberengwa District,
Runde RDC in Zvishavane District,
 Takawira RDC in Chirumhanzu District,
 Vungu RDC in Gweru District
 Zibagwe RDC in Kwekwe District
 Gokwe South RDC in Gokwe South District
 Gokwe North RDC in Gokwe North District

Wards Distribution

Tongogara RDC covers two constituencies with a total of 24 wards.

 Shurugwi-North Constituency has 9 wards; 1, 12, 13, 14, 15, 16, 17, 18 and 19.
 Shurugwi-South Constituency has 15 wards; 2, 3, 4, 5, 6, 7, 8, 9, 10, 11, 20, 21, 22, 23 and 24.

2013 - 2018 Councillors

Source: Zimbabwe Electoral Commission

2008 - 2013 Councilors

Source: Kubatana Archive

See also

 Shurugwi District 
 Gweru District 
 Kwekwe District

References 

Districts of Midlands Province